The Fever Tree is a collection of short stories by British author Ruth Rendell. It was first published in 1982.

Contents 
The collection contains 10 short-stories and one novella.

 The Fever Tree
 The Dreadful Day of Judgement
 A Glowing Future
 An Outside Interest
 A Case of Coincidence
 Thornapple (novella)
 May and June
 A Needle for the Devil
 Front Seat
 Paintbox Place
 The Wrong Category

External links 
 The Fever Tree and Other Stories on Internet Archive
 The Fever Tree and Other Stories on Goodreads.

1982 short story collections
Short story collections by Ruth Rendell
Hutchinson (publisher) books